Rigoberto Álvarez Barragán (born January 20, 1978) is a Mexican former professional boxer who competed from 2000 to 2011. Rigo is a former WBC FECARBOX super middleweight and interim WBA light middleweight champion.

Early life
Álvarez comes from a big boxing family, his brothers are welterweight prospects Ramón Álvarez, Ricardo Álvarez and the current Undisputed Super Middleweight  champion, Canelo Álvarez.

Professional career
Álvarez lost a close decision to William Gare in South Africa for the World Boxing Foundation super middleweight title.

In January 2010 he suffered his second loss by TKO to Marco Antonio Rubio for the WBC Latino middleweight title.

WBA World Light Middleweight championship
On October 9, 2010 Rigoberto fought Nobuhiro Ishida of Japan for his interim WBA Light Middleweight Championship. Álvarez defeated Ishida by decision.

Professional boxing record

See also

Notable boxing families

References

External links

 

1978 births
Living people
Mexican male boxers
Boxers from Jalisco
Light-middleweight boxers
Middleweight boxers
Super-middleweight boxers